Ireland for Europe was a civil society organisation set up after the defeat of the first Irish referendum to campaign in favour of the Treaty of Nice. Initially chaired by Adrian Langan, it was chaired by Ciarán Toland from October 2001. The campaign team was also led by Michelle O'Donnell (Secretary) and Kevin Byrne (Campaign Director). Ireland for Europe joined the Irish Alliance for Europe in August 2002, forming the backbone of its volunteer canvassing campaign. The group has been inactive since the end of 2002.

In June 2009 a new organisation of the same name was launched with Pat Cox as Director. For this he stepped down from his position as President of the European Movement International.

See also
Generation Yes

External links
Ireland for Europe - Ireland for Europe
Arts and sport stars join broad coalition for a Lisbon Yes vote Irish Times 22 June 2009
Irish Alliance for Europe - Irish Alliance for Europe
EUireland.ie - The EU in Ireland
Europe for Ireland - Europe for Ireland, European initiative to show support from abroad

References

Political movements